Wyethia glabra is a species of flowering plant in the family Asteraceae known by the common name Coast Range mule's ears. It is endemic to California, where it grows in the North and Central Coast Ranges. It is a perennial herb growing from a tough taproot and caudex unit and producing a stem up to 40 centimeters tall. It is hairless to hairy and glandular. The leaves have lance-shaped or oval blades up to 45 centimeters long. The inflorescence is usually a solitary flower head or occasionally a cluster of 2 or more. The head has lance-shaped leaflike phyllaries at the base. It contains up to 21 yellow ray florets each up to 5 centimeters long and many yellow disc florets. The fruit is an achene over a centimeter long, including its pappus.

References

External links

Jepson Manual Treatment
USDA Plants Profile
Flora of North America
Photo gallery

glabra
Endemic flora of California